Tetracha gracilis is a species of tiger beetle that was described by Reiche in 1842. The species can be found only in Colombia and  Venezuela.

References

Cicindelidae
Beetles described in 1842
Beetles of South America